Walbrook is a ward, a street and a subterranean river in the City of London.

Walbrook may also refer to:

Places
Walbrook, Baltimore, a neighborhood in Baltimore, Maryland, USA
Walbrook High School, a high school in Baltimore, Maryland, USA

People
Louise Walbrook, pen name of novelist Edith Templeton (1916–2006)
Anton Walbrook (1896–1967),  Austrian actor

See also
St Stephen Walbrook
Walbrook Wharf
Walbrook Rowing Club
St John the Baptist upon Walbrook
Wallbrook (disambiguation)